Bizaardvark is an American comedy television series created by Kyle Stegina and Josh Lehrman that premiered on Disney Channel on June 24, 2016. The series ran for three seasons consisting of 63 episodes, airing its final episode on April 13, 2019. The series stars Madison Hu, Olivia Rodrigo, Jake Paul, DeVore Ledridge, Ethan Wacker, Maxwell Simkins, and Elie Samouhi. In addition to the series' regular episodes, the series has also aired shorts under the title of Bizaardvark Shorts.

Series overview

Episodes

Season 1 (2016–17)

Season 2 (2017–18)

Season 3 (2018–19)

Bizaardvark Shorts (2017) 
 Bizaardvark Shorts consists of 2–4-minute shorts.

References 

Lists of American children's television series episodes
Lists of American comedy television series episodes
Lists of Disney Channel television series episodes